Sustainable menstruation refers to the use of environmentally-friendly and responsible menstrual products. 

It is estimated that the average woman will bleed for an average of 40 years which can amount to upwards of 200 kg of menstrual product waste a year. To combat this environmental challenge, advocates of sustainable menstruation promote the use of reusable products such as cloth menstrual pads, menstrual cups and period underwear, and also sustainably-produced biodegradable disposable products. Such practices reduce the waste created by disposable products (tampons and pads) made of non-biodegradable materials. 

In several countries, menstrual products are defined as 'medical waste' creating an increased difficulty in knowing exactly how much menstrual products contribute to general waste. In countries such as India, there are concerns surrounding manual scavenging, where waste picking and segregation is done by hand, by people. A sustainable approach to menstruation also attempts to tackle the issue of human rights and dignity of manual scavengers. There is some concern that by focusing on menstruation as a focus in discussions in waste, it further stigmatizes menstruation by blaming women for problems they didn't create. In India, 6% of non-biodegradable waste is created by hygiene products including menstruation products, wipes and diaper.

References

Feminine hygiene
Menstrual cycle